Rudolph John Kutler (November 14, 1901 – March 20, 1974) was an American football player and coach. He played college football at Ohio State University from 1921 to 1924 and professionally in the National Football League (NFL) with the Cleveland Bulldogs in 1925.  Kutler served two stints at the head football coach at Kenyon College, in 1932 and from 1941 to 1943, compiling a record of 14–7–3.

Head coaching record

References

External links
 

1901 births
1974 deaths
American football guards
Cleveland Bulldogs players
Kenyon Lords and Ladies athletic directors
Kenyon Lords football coaches
Ohio State Buckeyes football players
Sportspeople from Cleveland
Coaches of American football from Ohio
Players of American football from Cleveland
Austro-Hungarian emigrants to the United States